Peter Bamm (a pen name; his real name was Curt Emmrich; 20 October 1897 in Hochneukirch, now part of Jüchen, Germany – 30 March 1975 in Zollikon, Switzerland) was a German writer.

Peter Bamm volunteered for military service in World War I, after which he studied medicine and sinology in Munich, Göttingen and Freiburg im Breisgau. As a ship's doctor he travelled the world a great deal before eventually settling in Berlin-Wedding.

During World War II he served as a military doctor on the Russian Front, and later described his experiences in the book "Die Unsichtbare Flagge" (The Invisible Flag). After the war he travelled for study purposes between 1952 and 1957 in the Near and Middle East, after which he wrote as a journalist and feature writer for a number of Berlin newspapers.

He is buried in the Stöcken Cemetery in Hanover.

Works 
Peter Bamm published many journalistic pieces, many of them extremely witty and ironic. He also wrote scientific and medical essays, culture-historical travel books and an autobiography.

 Ex ovo ("Out of the Egg") (essays about medicine), 1948
 Die unsichtbare Flagge ("The Invisible Flag") (account of his war experiences), 1952
 Frühe Stätten der Christenheit ("Early Sites of Christianity") (travel book), 1955
 Wiege unserer Welt ("Cradle of Our World"), 1958 (ed.)
 Welten des Glaubens ("Worlds of Faith"), 1959
 Frühe Stätten der Christenheit ("The Kingdoms of Christ: From the Days of the Apostles to the Middle Ages"), 1959
 An den Küsten des Lichts ("On the Coasts of Light") (travel book), 1961
 Alexander oder die Verwandlung der Welt ("Alexander, or The Transformation of the World") (biography), 1965
 Alexander der Große. Ein königliches Leben ("Alexander the Great. A Royal Life"), 1968
 Anarchie mit Liebe ("Anarchy with Love") (collection of essays)
 Eines Menschen Zeit ("Time of a Human Being") (autobiography), 1972
 Am Rande der Schöpfung ("On the Edge of Creation") (essays and articles), 1974

External links 
 

1897 births
1975 deaths
German military doctors
German medical writers
German military personnel of World War I
German military personnel of World War II
German travel writers
German male journalists
German biographers
Male biographers
German essayists
People from the Rhine Province
German male writers
German male essayists
20th-century essayists
Commanders Crosses of the Order of Merit of the Federal Republic of Germany
20th-century German journalists